Son ar chistr ("The song of the cider" in the Breton language, "Ev Chistr ’ta Laou!" originally) is a traditional song of Brittany, whose words in Breton were written in 1929 by two Morbihan teenagers Jean Bernard and Jean-Marie Prima. The melody became known by the interpretation of the famous Breton singer Alan Stivell in the 1970s and in 1977 by the Dutch band Bots under the name "Zeven dagen lang".

Use
The song is still used by folk groups around the world and has been translated into many languages. Though many groups keep the popular motif, the lyrics sometimes differ completely from the original. Recordings include:
 Elen Guychard - Tudjentil Baod (1940)
 Kevrenn Saint-Malo & Jacques Malard - Ev Chistr Ta Laou! Skaer (1959)
 Alan Stivell — Son Ar Chistr (1970)
 Bots — Zeven dagen lang (1976)
 Frida Boccara — La Mariée (1976)
 Oktoberklub — Was wollen wir trinken (1977)
 Bots — Sieben Tage lang (1980)
 Angelo Branduardi — Gulliver (1980)
 The Chieftains — Ev Chistr 'Ta, Laou! (1987)
 Rabauken — Was wollen wir trinken (1995)
 De Höhner — Was wollen wir trinken sieben Tage lang (1995)
 The Pitcher — Drink (1995)
 Rapalje — Wat zullen we drinken (1998)
 Scooter — How Much Is the Fish? (1998), (2006)
 Александр Пушной — Почём Камбала? (1999)
 Non Servium — Seguimos siendo (1999)
 Onkel Tom Angelripper — Medley Aus 6 Liedern (1999)
 Mervent — Ev Sistr (2001)
 Bullig — Was Sollen Wir Trinken (2001)
 Luar Na Lubre — Espiral (2002)
 Blackmore’s Night — All For One (2003)
 Gigi & Die Braunen Stadtmusikanten (Daniel Giese) — Was wollen wir singen (2004)
 Adorned Brood — 7 Tage Lang (2006)
 Dick O'Brass — Son ar Christ (2006)
 Ray Fisher, Martin Carthy - Willie's Lady (2006)
 The Highstreet Allstars — Rock That Beat (2007)
 Mickie Krause — Jan Pillemann Otze (2008)
 K.I.Z — Was kostet der Fisch (2009)
 Leshak/Лешак — Was wollen wir trinken (2009)
 Gens Goliae —  La sidra (2010)
 Meldis — Son ar Sistr (2010)
 Молот — Вперёд, Товарищ! (2010)
 Teekkarikuoro - Sahtilaulu (2010)
 Tikkey A. Shelyen — Во славу сидра (2011)
 Tom Angelripper  (Sodom) — Was wollen wir trinken (2011)
 Basslovers United —  Drunken (2012)
 Джек и Тень — Ev Sistr (2012)
 Hakka Muggies — Den už končí (2012)
 F.R.A.M. — Ev Sistr (2013)
 Tony Junior — Twerk Anthem (2013)
 Anaïs Mitchell, Jefferson Hamer — Willie's Lady (Child 6) (2013)
 TheEWYFSFridge — I used to love her (2014)
 Lesya Roy - А як ти підеш на війну (How will you go to the war?) (2015)
 Marc Korn — 6 Pounds (2016)
 Gwennyn — Avalon (2016), Breizh eo ma bro! (2017)
 Eluveitie — Lvgvs (2017)
 DArtagnan — Was wollen wir trinken (2017)
 Sefa, MC Focus - Wat Zullen We Drinken  (2018)
 Marc Korn, Jaycee Madoxx — Miracle (2019)
 Dimitri Vegas, Like Mike — The Chase (2020)
 Ringnes-Ronny — VI SKA BLI FULLA (2021)
 ADHD — Lev Mette (2021)
 Bordó Sárkány — Két világ (2021)

See also

Bibliography 
  A. Stivell et J-N Verdier, Telenn, la Harpe Bretonne, 2004, p. 123
  Frédéric Prima, «Son ar chistr. Une chanson qui fait le tour du monde», dans Musique bretonne no 173, juillet 2002, p. 36-37
  Jean-Marie Prima, «Aux origines d'une chanson... Son ar chistr», dans Musique bretonne no 136, juillet 1995, p. 22-24

1929 songs
Breton songs